The Letter U and the Numeral 2 is a 96-page magazine and 25-minute CD by Negativland detailing their conflict with the band U2, over Negativland's EP of the same name. It was released in 1992 as a limited edition of 4000 copies. Two months after its release, SST Records blocked its distribution with a lawsuit claiming, among other things, copyright infringement based on reproductions of press releases sent to the press by SST; "in essence, suing the band for printing (their) threat to sue the band". SST's lawsuit is similar to the "Streisand effect".

Three years later, Negativland re-released this as Fair Use: The Story of the Letter U and the Numeral 2. It included "Crosley Bendix Discusses the U.S. Copyright Act" plus nine other tracks.

Track listing
 "Crosley Bendix Discusses the U.S. Copyright Act" - 25:56

Personnel

Mark Hosler 
Richard Lyons 
David Wills
Don Joyce
Chris Grigg

See also
 These Guys Are from England and Who Gives a Shit

Interview albums
Negativland EPs
1992 live albums
1992 EPs
Live EPs
Sampling controversies
SST Records EPs
SST Records live albums